Mordeh Shureh-ye Posht Tang (also Romanized as Mordeh Shūreh-ye Posht Tang; also known as Mordeh Shūr Khāneh) is a village in Kakavand-e Sharqi Rural District, Kakavand District, Delfan County, Lorestan Province, Iran. At the 2006 census, its population was 80, in 16 families.

References 

Towns and villages in Delfan County